Sophocles Sophocleous (born 7 August 1962) is a Cypriot Movement for Social Democracy politician. He sat as a Member of the European Parliament for Cyprus between 2012 and 2014. He was the Cypriot Minister of Justice and Public Order from 2006 to 2008.

Sophocleous is a law graduate of the Aristotle University of Thessaloniki. He was the mayor of Pano Lefkara, his hometown, from 1992 to 2006, and he was the vice-president of the Movement for Social Democracy from 2000 to 2012. He was appointed Minister of Justice and Public Order in 2006, and he stayed in post until Tassos Papadopoulos lost the Cypriot presidency at the 2008 presidential election. Sophocleous took the seat of Kyriakos Mavronikolas in the European Parliament following the latter's resignation in 2012.

Footnotes

1962 births
Living people
People from Larnaca District
Cyprus Ministers of Justice and Public Order
Movement for Social Democracy MEPs
MEPs for Cyprus 2009–2014
Aristotle University of Thessaloniki alumni